Julián Ignacio Rodríguez Seguer (born 11 April 1997) is an Argentine professional footballer who plays as a forward for Deportivo Laferrere.

Career
Rodríguez's career began with Comunicaciones. He started featuring for their first-team in the 2016–17 Primera B Metropolitana, making his professional debut on 6 May 2017 versus Fénix; replacing Darío Ramella after seventy-seven minutes. His first appearance as a starter arrived a week later against San Telmo, a fixture he left twenty-seven minutes early after receiving a red card. Rodríguez ended the 2016–17 season by appearing in the promotion play-offs, where he scored goals against Barracas Central and Estudiantes; though they'd be eliminated by Deportivo Riestra. Four goals in twenty-four games occurred in 2017–18.

Rodríguez spent the 2019–20 season with Colegiales, making eleven appearances and scoring once before departing in June 2020. After a short spell at Deportivo Riestra in 2021, Rodríguez moved to Deportivo Laferrere ahead of the 2022 season.

Career statistics
.

References

External links

1997 births
Living people
Place of birth missing (living people)
Argentine footballers
Association football forwards
Primera B Metropolitana players
Club Comunicaciones footballers
Club Atlético Colegiales (Argentina) players
Deportivo Riestra players
Deportivo Laferrere footballers